The Nicaragua men's national basketball team is the national basketball team in Nicaragua. They have yet to appear in the FIBA World Cup or the FIBA AmeriCup.

It is managed by the Federación Nicaraguense de Baloncesto (FENIBALON).

Nicaragua's greatest accomplishment has been the silver medal at the 2017 Central American Games. Nicaragua won all games until they reached the final where they ceded to Panama 59-72, despite the support of 8,000 fans at the Polideportivo Alexis Argüello.

Competitions

Summer Olympics
yet to qualify

FIBA World Cup
yet to qualify

FIBA AmeriCup
yet to qualify

Pan American Games

yet to qualify

Centrobasket

 1965-2010: Did not compete
 2012: 10th
 2014: Did not compete
 2016: 8th

Central American Games

 1973-2013: ?
 2017: 
 2022: To be determined

Current roster
At the 2023 FIBA Basketball World Cup qualification (Americas):

|}

| valign="top" |

Head coach

Assistant coaches

Legend

Club – describes lastclub before the tournament
Age – describes ageon 19 April 2021

|}

Depth chart

Head coach position
  Angel Mallona – 2016, 2017
  David Rosario – Since 2021

Past rosters
At the 2016 Centrobasket:

|}

| valign="top" |

Head coach

Assistant coaches

Legend

Club – describes lastclub before the tournament
Age – describes ageon 19 June 2016

|}
At the 2017 Central American Games :

|}

| valign="top" |

Head coach

Assistant coaches

Legend

Club – describes lastclub before the tournament
Age – describes ageon 3 December 2017

|}

See also
Nicaragua  women's national basketball team
Nicaragua  national under-19 basketball team
Nicaragua  national under-17 basketball team
Nicaragua  national 3x3 team

References

External links
Official website
Archived records of Nicaragua team participations
Latinbasket.com - Nicaragua Men National Team 
Facebook presentation

Videos
 Antigua(ANT) v Nicaragua (NCA) Game Highlights - Group A - 2016 FIBA Centrobasket Championship Youtube.com video

Men's national basketball teams
Basketball
Basketball teams in Nicaragua
1959 establishments in Nicaragua